KCSP may refer to:

 KCSP (AM), a radio station (610 AM) licensed to Kansas City, Missouri, United States
 KCSP-FM, a radio station (90.3 FM) licensed to Casper, Wyoming, United States
 KC Space Pirates, a team that competed in Space Elevator Games 
 King's Cross St Pancras tube station, a London Underground station in the United Kingdom
 Knowingly Concealing Stolen Property, see possession of stolen goods